Dana Prieto is an American far-right politician who is the Oklahoma Senate member from the 34th district.

Early life and career 
Dana Prieto grew up in and graduated from high school in western New York, where he ran a floor clean company before moving to Oklahoma in 1991. After moving to Oklahoma, he attended Rhema Bible College in Broken Arrow.
Prior to running for elected office, he worked in search engine marketing.

2018 campaign 
Prieto campaigned for the Republican nomination in Oklahoma's 36th Senate district in 2018. He credits volunteering for one of Nathan Dahm's campaign's as encouraging him to run for office. He lost the primary election to John Haste.

Oklahoma Senate 
Prieto ran for Oklahoma's 34th Senate district in 2022 against incumbent Democratic Senator J.J. Dossett. During the campaign he was endorsed by Christian nationalist organizations Ekklesia of Oklahoma and City Elders. He self-described his politics as "very conservative" and "far right." He defeated Dossett in the November general election and assumed office November 16, 2022.

Electoral history

References 

21st-century American politicians
Christian nationalists
Far-right politicians in the United States
Living people
Republican Party Oklahoma state senators
Year of birth missing (living people)